

This is a list of the National Register of Historic Places listings in St. Tammany Parish, Louisiana.

This is intended to be a complete list of the properties and districts on the National Register of Historic Places in St. Tammany Parish, Louisiana, United States. The locations of National Register properties and districts for which the latitude and longitude coordinates are included below, may be seen in a map.

There are 43 properties and districts listed on the National Register in the parish.  Another property was once listed, but has since been removed.

Current listings

|}

Former listings

|}

See also

List of National Historic Landmarks in Louisiana
National Register of Historic Places listings in Louisiana

References

St. Tammany Parish